Puerto Rico competed at the 1988 Summer Olympics in Seoul, South Korea.

Competitors
The following is the list of number of competitors in the Games.

Results by event

Archery
In the fourth time this U.S. territory competed in archery at the Olympics, Puerto Rico entered one man and one woman.

Women's Individual Competition:
 Gloria Rosa — Preliminary Round (→ 54th place)

Men's Individual Competition:
 Miguel Pedraza — Preliminary Round (→ 67th place)

Athletics
Men's 200 metres
Edgardo Guilbe

Men's 400 metres Hurdles
Domingo Cordero

Men's Long Jump
Raul Tejada
 Qualification — NM (→ did not advance)

Men's Triple Jump
Ernesto Torres

Women's Long Jump
 Madeline de Jesús

Basketball

Men's tournament

Team roster

Group play

Quarterfinals

Classification round 5–8

Classification round 7/8

Boxing
Men's Light Flyweight (– 48 kg)
 Luis Román Rolón 
 First Round — Bye
 Second Round — Lost to Chatchai Sasakul (THA), 2:3

Men's Flyweight
 Andy Agosto

Men's Bantamweight
 Felipe Nieves

Men's Featherweight
 Esteban Flores

Men's Lightweight
 Héctor Arroyo

Men's Light-Welterweight
 Víctor Pérez

Men's Welterweight
 Lionel Ortíz

Men's Light-Middleweight
 Rey Rivera

Men's Light-Heavyweight
 Nelson Adams

Men's Super-Heavyweight
 Harold Arroyo

Judo

Men's Extra-Lightweight
 Luis Martínez

Men's Half-Lightweight
 Víctor Rivera

Men's Lightweight
 Angelo Ruiz

Men's Middleweight
 Jorge Bonnet

Swimming
Men's 50m Freestyle
 Manuel Guzmán
 Heat — 23.61 (→ did not advance, 24th place)

Men's 100m Freestyle
 Manuel Guzmán
 Heat — 51.25 (→ did not advance, 24th place)

Men's 200m Freestyle
 Salvador Vassallo
 Heat — 1:53.82 (→ did not advance, 36th place)

Men's 400m Freestyle
 Salvador Vassallo
 Heat — 3:55.30
 B-Final — 3:55.39 (→ 15th place)

Men's 100m Backstroke
 Manuel Guzmán
 Heat — 57.62 (→ did not advance, 24th place)
 B-Final — 57.95 (→ 15th place)

Men's 400m Individual Medley
 Salvador Vassallo
 Heat — 4:30.37 (→ did not advance, 20th place)

Women's 200m Freestyle
 Ritajean Garay
 Heat — 2:07.44 (→ did not advance, 33rd place)

Women's 400m Freestyle
 Ritajean Garay
 Heat — 4:24.84 (→ did not advance, 28th place)

Women's 800m Freestyle
 Ritajean Garay
 Heat — 9:04.62 (→ did not advance, 27th place)

Women's 100m Backstroke
 Ritajean Garay
 Heat — 1:08.58 (→ did not advance, 31st place)

Women's 200m Backstroke
 Ritajean Garay
 Heat — 2:23.73 (→ did not advance, 24th place)

See also

Puerto Rico at the 1987 Pan American Games

References

Official Olympic Reports
sports-reference

Nations at the 1988 Summer Olympics
1988
Olympics